This is a list of the NCAA outdoor champions in the discus throw.  Measurement was conducted in imperial distances (feet and inches) until 1975.  Metrication occurred in 1976, so all subsequent championships were measured in metric distances.

Champions
Key
A=Altitude assisted

References

External links
NCAA Division I men's outdoor track and field
GBR Athletics

Discus NCAA Men's Division I Outdoor Track and Field Championships
Outdoor track, men
discus throw